Tingley is a city in northern Ringgold County, Iowa, United States. The population was 136 at the time of the 2020 census.

History
Tingley was founded in 1883.

Geography

Demographics

2010 census
As of the census of 2010, there were 184 people, 76 households, and 48 families living in the city. The racial makeup of the city was 100.0% White. Hispanic or Latino of any race were 0.5% of the population.

There were 76 households, of which 27.6% had children under the age of 18 living with them, 52.6% were married couples living together, 7.9% had a female householder with no husband present, 2.6% had a male householder with no wife present, and 36.8% were non-families. 27.6% of all households were made up of individuals, and 19.7% had someone living alone who was 65 years of age or older. The average household size was 2.42 and the average family size was 2.98.

The median age in the city was 45 years. 27.2% of residents were under the age of 18; 4.8% were between the ages of 18 and 24; 17.9% were from 25 to 44; 18.5% were from 45 to 64; and 31.5% were 65 years of age or older. The gender makeup of the city was 47.3% male and 52.7% female.

2000 census
As of the census of 2000, there were 171 people, 87 households, and 44 families living in the city. The racial makeup of the city was 98.25% White, and 1.75% from two or more races. Hispanic or Latino of any race were 0.58% of the population.

There were 87 households, out of which 19.5% had children under the age of 18 living with them, 42.5% were married couples living together, 6.9% had a female householder with no husband present, and 48.3% were non-families. 46.0% of all households were made up of individuals, and 33.3% had someone living alone who was 65 years of age or older. The average household size was 1.97 and the average family size was 2.78.

In the city, the population was spread out, with 19.9% under the age of 18, 6.4% from 18 to 24, 20.5% from 25 to 44, 27.5% from 45 to 64, and 25.7% who were 65 years of age or older. The median age was 49 years. For every 100 females, there were 81.9 males. For every 100 females age 18 and over, there were 69.1 males.

The median income for a household in the city was $22,321, and the median income for a family was $34,375. Males had a median income of $26,250 versus $22,222 for females. The per capita income for the city was $14,475. About 7.7% of families and 10.1% of the population were below the poverty line, including 2.7% of those under the age of eighteen and 19.0% of those 65 or over.

Education
Mount Ayr Community School District operates public schools serving the community.

References

Cities in Ringgold County, Iowa
Cities in Iowa
Populated places established in 1883